The 1952 Singapore Open, also known as the 1952 Singapore Badminton Championships, took place from 1 November – 29 December 1952 at the Singapore Badminton Hall in Singapore. The ties were played over a few months with the first round ties being played on the 1st of November and the finals were played on the 29th of December.

Venue
Singapore Badminton Hall

Final results

References 

Singapore Open (badminton)
1952 in badminton